Harald Astrup Arnesen (born 24 April 1995) is a Norwegian cross-country skier.

He made his World Cup debut in January 2020 in Dresden, collecting his first World Cup points with an 8th place.

He represents the sports club IL Heming.

Cross-country skiing results
All results are sourced from the International Ski Federation (FIS).

World Cup

Season standings

References 

1995 births
Living people
Skiers from Oslo
Norwegian male cross-country skiers